Predrag Tasovac (Serbian Cyrillic: Предраг Тасовац; 9 August 1922 – 22 September 2010) was a Serbian actor. He appeared in more than eighty films from 1952 to 2005.

Selected filmography

References

External links

1922 births
2010 deaths
People from Šamac, Bosnia and Herzegovina
Serbs of Bosnia and Herzegovina
Serbian male film actors
Yugoslav male actors